Nørre Broby, or simply Broby, is a small town in southwest-central Funen, Denmark, to the northeast of Haarby. It was the seat of Broby Municipality between 1970 and 2006 until the municipality was dissolved and merged with Faaborg-Midtfyn Municipality. 1 January 2022 it had a population of 1,460. Nørre Broby Church (kirke), dated to around 1100, is located in the town. It also contains the Broby Library.
It has a history of clover production, and farmers in the Nørre Broby area were already cultivating it in 1785.

Notable people 
 Maja Jager (born 1991 in Nørre Broby) a Danish female archer, competed at the 2012 Summer Olympics

References

Populated places in Funen
Faaborg-Midtfyn Municipality